The Coogee Surf Life Saving Club is a foundation member of the surf lifesaving movement in Australia. It was founded in 1907 by a group of concerned locals and has a proud history of no lives being lost whilst its members have patrolled. Coogee SLSC celebrated its 100-year anniversary in 2007, the Year of the Lifesaver.

Coogee SLSC has a history, which includes many firsts in the lifesaving movement. These include the first night surf carnival, the first mass rescue, the first shark attack and the development of the resuscitation technique. The Coogee SLSC clubhouse sits at the southern end of Coogee beach. The club's activities are managed and run by volunteers, with the assistance of a variety of community concerned sponsors, including Sydney City Renault.

Coogee SLSC has a representative on the Wylie's Baths Trust and conducts patrols at Wylie's Baths during summer.

The Club conducts an annual swimming event around Wedding Cake Island each November.  The event began in 2000 and attracts hundreds of competitors each year and is a prominent event on the Sydney Ocean Swim calendar.

See also

Surf lifesaving
Surf Life Saving Australia
List of Australian surf lifesaving clubs

References

External links
 
 

Organisations based in New South Wales
Surf Life Saving Australia clubs
Sporting clubs in Sydney
1907 establishments in Australia
Sports clubs established in 1907
Coogee, New South Wales